Rexichthys johnpaxtoni, the Paxton's escolar, is a species of snake mackerel found in the western Pacific Ocean from around Australia and New Caledonia where it is found at depths of from .  This species grows to a length of  SL.  This species is the only known member of its genus, the specific name honours John R. Paxton, a curator of the collection of fishes of the Australian Museum in Sydney.

References

External links
 Drawing

Gempylidae
Monotypic fish genera
Fish described in 1997